The 2007 Stanley Cup playoffs of the National Hockey League began on April 11, 2007. The sixteen teams that qualified, eight from each conference, played best-of-seven series for conference quarterfinals, semifinals and championships, and then the conference champions played a best-of-seven series for the Stanley Cup. The series ended on June 6 with the Anaheim Ducks defeating the Ottawa Senators in five games to win their first ever championship.

For the first time in NHL history, neither of the two teams that played in the previous year's Stanley Cup Finals (the Carolina Hurricanes and the Edmonton Oilers) qualified for the playoffs. For the first time since 1994, all four former WHA teams; Carolina (formerly the Hartford Whalers), Colorado (formerly the Quebec Nordiques), Edmonton, and Phoenix (formerly the Winnipeg Jets) missed the playoffs in the same year, this would not happen again until 2013. Also for the first time since 1994, the Philadelphia Flyers missed the playoffs.  This was the only time that the Atlanta Thrashers qualified for the playoffs in their twelve years in Georgia (they became the new Winnipeg Jets in 2011).

Playoff seeds

Eastern Conference
Buffalo Sabres, Northeast Division champions, Eastern Conference regular season champions, Presidents' Trophy winners – 113 points (53 wins)
New Jersey Devils, Atlantic Division champions – 107 points
Atlanta Thrashers, Southeast Division champions – 97 points
Ottawa Senators – 105 points (48 wins)
Pittsburgh Penguins – 105 points (47 wins)
New York Rangers – 94 points
Tampa Bay Lightning – 93 points
New York Islanders – 92 points

Western Conference
Detroit Red Wings, Central Division champions, Western Conference regular season champions – 113 points (50 wins)
Anaheim Ducks, Pacific Division champions – 110 points
Vancouver Canucks, Northwest Division champions – 105 points
Nashville Predators – 110 points
San Jose Sharks – 107 points (51 wins)
Dallas Stars – 107 points (50 wins)
Minnesota Wild – 104 points
Calgary Flames – 96 points

Playoff bracket
In each round, the highest remaining seed in each conference is matched against the lowest remaining seed. The higher-seeded team is awarded home ice advantage, which gives them a maximum possible four games on their home ice, with the other team getting a maximum possible three. In the Stanley Cup Finals, home ice is determined based on regular season points.

Conference Quarterfinals

Eastern Conference Quarterfinals

(1) Buffalo Sabres vs. (8) New York Islanders

The Buffalo Sabres entered the playoffs as the Presidents' Trophy winners (winning the tie-breaker with Detroit in total wins), the Eastern Conference regular season and Northeast Division champions with 113 points. The Islanders qualified as the eighth seed earning 92 points during the regular season. This was the fourth and most recent playoff meeting between these two teams, with New York winning all three of the previous series. They last met in the 1980 Stanley Cup Semifinals where New York won in six games. Buffalo won three of the four games during this year's regular season series.

The Sabres defeated the Islanders in five games. Brian Campbell and Chris Drury each scored twice for the Sabres in game one as they took the opening game 4–1. Marc-Andre Bergeron's power play goal at 8:37 of the third period gave the Islanders the lead in game two as they evened the series with a 3–2 victory. Sabres forward Daniel Briere scored the game-winning goal with a two-man advantage in the second period of game three giving Buffalo a 3–2 win. Chris Drury scored two goals in a game for the second time in this series as the Sabres won game four by a final score of 4–2. Buffalo held off a late charge by the Islanders in game five as they eliminated New York with a 4–3 win.

(2) New Jersey Devils vs. (7) Tampa Bay Lightning

The New Jersey Devils entered the playoffs as the Atlantic Division champions, earning the second seed in the Eastern Conference with 107 points. Tampa Bay qualified as the seventh seed, earning 93 points during the regular season. This was the second meeting between these two teams, with New Jersey winning the only previous series in the 2003 Eastern Conference Semifinals in five games. Tampa Bay won three of the four games during this year's regular season series.

The Devils defeated the Lightning in six games. New Jersey forward Zach Parise scored twice as New Jersey took game one 5–3.  Johan Holmqvist made 34 saves for the Lightning and Vincent Lecavalier scored the game-winning goal early in the third period of game two as Tampa Bay evened the series with a 3–2 victory. The teams traded goals early in the third period of game three before Vaclav Prospal broke the tie with 6:29 remaining in regulation time as the Lightning won again by a score of 3–2. Devils centre Scott Gomez scored the overtime winner at 12:54 in game four to tie the series. New Jersey goaltender Martin Brodeur made 31 saves in his 22nd career playoff shutout as the Devils won game five 3–0. Devils forward Brian Gionta scored the series-winning goal in game six as New Jersey took the series four games to two with a 3–2 win.

(3) Atlanta Thrashers vs. (6) New York Rangers

The Atlanta Thrashers entered the playoffs as the Southeast Division champions, earning the third seed in the Eastern Conference with 97 points. The Rangers qualified as the sixth seed earning 94 points during the regular season. This was the first and to this date only playoff meeting between these two teams. This series also marked the first appearance of a team representing Atlanta in the Stanley Cup playoffs in 27 years. The most recent team to represent Atlanta prior to this was the Atlanta Flames who lost in the Preliminary Round in 1980. The Thrashers made their first playoff appearance since entering the league in the 1999–2000 season; this was the only playoff appearance that Atlanta made before the franchise relocated to Winnipeg in 2011. Atlanta won three of the four games during this year's regular season series.

The Rangers swept Atlanta in four games. New York entered the third period of game one with a two-goal lead and hung on to win by a score of 4–3. Ranger forward Brendan Shanahan scored the game-winner with four minutes remaining in game two as New York earned a 2–1 victory. The Rangers dominated Atlanta in game three winning 7–0, Michael Nylander scored a hat trick in the victory. Matt Cullen scored the series-clinching goal in game four and Jaromir Jagr added an empty-net goal in the dying minutes as New York completed the sweep of the Thrashers with a 4–2 win.

(4) Ottawa Senators vs. (5) Pittsburgh Penguins

The Ottawa Senators entered the playoffs as the fourth seed in the Eastern Conference with 105 points. The Pittsburgh Penguins also earned 105 points during the regular season, but they finished as the fifth seed in the Eastern Conference after losing the tie-breaker with Ottawa in total wins. This was the first playoff meeting between these two teams. The Penguins qualified for the playoffs for the first time since 2001. Pittsburgh won this year's four-game regular season series earning six of eight points.

The Senators defeated the Penguins in five games. Penguins goaltender Marc-Andre Fleury was pulled in game one after allowing six goals to the Senators in a 6–3 loss. The Penguins scored three times in the third period as they overcame a one-goal deficit to defeat Ottawa 4–3 in game two and tie the series. Senators captain Daniel Alfredsson scored the game-winner and added an insurance goal in game three as Ottawa regained home-ice advantage with a 4–2 win. Just over nine minutes into the third period of game four Anton Volchenkov broke the tie for the Senators giving his team a 2–1 victory. After a scoreless opening period in game five the Senators struck three times in the second period and goaltender Ray Emery posted a 20 save shutout to eliminate the Penguins with a 3–0 win.

Western Conference Quarterfinals

(1) Detroit Red Wings vs. (8) Calgary Flames

The Detroit Red Wings entered the playoffs as the Western Conference regular season and Central Division champions (losing the tie-breaker with Buffalo in total wins for the Presidents' Trophy) with 113 points. Calgary qualified as the eighth seed earning 96 points during the regular season. This was the third and most recent playoff meeting between these two teams, with the teams splitting the two previous series. They last met in the 2004 Western Conference Semifinals where Calgary won in six games. The teams split this year's four-game regular season series.

The Red Wings eliminated the Flames in six games. In game one the Red Wings dominated the Flames in a 4–1 victory. Flames goaltender Miikka Kiprusoff made 48 saves in game two as his team lost 3–1 and the Red Wings took a 2–0 series lead. Jarome Iginla scored the game-winning goal in game three as the Flames won by a score of 3–2. Calgary centre Daymond Langkow scored twice on the power play in game four as the Flames evened the series with a 3–2 win. After allowing five goals against in game five Flames goaltender Miikka Kiprusoff was pulled in favour of backup Jamie McLennan. Kiprusoff was forced back into the game just 18 seconds later as Jamie McLennan was assessed a match penalty and game misconduct for slashing Red Wings forward Johan Franzen in the stomach. McLennan was later suspended for five games; the Flames organization and Head Coach Jim Playfair were also fined after a 5–1 loss. Johan Franzen scored the series-winner in double overtime in game six as the Red Wings eliminated the Flames with a 2–1 victory.

(2) Anaheim Ducks vs. (7) Minnesota Wild

The Anaheim Ducks entered the playoffs as the Pacific Division champions, earning the second seed in the Western Conference with 110 points. Minnesota qualified as the seventh seed earning 104 points during the regular season. This was the second and most recent playoff meeting between these two teams, with Anaheim winning the only previous series. They last met in the 2003 Western Conference Final where Anaheim won in four games. Anaheim won this year's four-game regular season series earning five of eight points.

The Ducks eliminated the Wild in five games. Ducks forward Dustin Penner scored the game-winner late in the third period as Anaheim took game one 2–1. In game two Francois Beauchemin scored twice on the power-play for the Ducks as they took a 2–0 series lead with a 3–2 win. The Ducks earned a tight win in game three with a 2–1 victory. The Wild avoided elimination with a three-goal third period in game four, earning a 4–1 win. Jean-Sebastien Giguere started game five for the Ducks and Ryan Getzlaf scored the series-winning goal late in the second period as Anaheim ended the series with a 4–1 victory.

(3) Vancouver Canucks vs. (6) Dallas Stars

The Vancouver Canucks entered the playoffs as the Northwest Division champions, earning the third seed in the Western Conference with 105 points. Dallas qualified as the sixth seed earning 107 points (losing the tie-breaker with San Jose in total wins) during the regular season. This was the second and most recent playoff meeting between these two teams with Vancouver winning the only previous series. They last met in the 1994 Western Conference Semifinals where Vancouver won in five games. The teams split this year's four-game regular season series.

Vancouver hung on to defeat the Stars in seven games. Dallas overcame a two-goal deficit in game one to force overtime, however, they came up short as Henrik Sedin won the game for Vancouver when he scored at 18:06 of the fourth overtime; this was the sixth-longest playoff game in NHL history. Roberto Luongo made 72 saves in the 5–4 Canucks victory. The Stars opened game two with a goal just 24 seconds in and the Canucks were not able to recover as Dallas goaltender Marty Turco posted a 35 save shutout in a 2–0 win. Canucks forward Taylor Pyatt scored the game-winner at 7:47 of the first overtime for a 2–1 win in game three. The Canucks pulled out another 2–1 victory in game four as Mattias Ohlund and Trevor Linden scored for Vancouver. In game five both Roberto Luongo and Marty Turco pushed aside every shot in regulation and Stars captain Brenden Morrow scored the only goal of the game 6:22 into the first overtime for a 1–0 Dallas victory. Marty Turco shutout Vancouver in game six for the second consecutive game and the third time overall in the series as the Stars forced a seventh game with a 2–0 win. After allowing the opening goal in game seven the Canucks scored four unanswered goals and took the deciding game of the series 4–1.

(4) Nashville Predators vs. (5) San Jose Sharks

The Nashville Predators entered the playoffs as the fourth seed in the Western Conference with 110 points. San Jose qualified as the fifth seed earning 107 points (winning the tie-breaker with Dallas in total wins) during the regular season. This was the second playoff meeting between these two teams with San Jose winning the only previous series. They last met in the previous year's Western Conference Quarterfinals where San Jose won in five games. Nashville won three of the four games during this year's regular season series.

For the second consecutive year, the Sharks eliminated Nashville in five games. Patrick Rissmiller scored the overtime winner for San Jose at 8:14 of the second overtime period as the Sharks won a high-scoring game one 5–4. Predator forwards Jean-Pierre Dumont and Peter Forsberg scored twice in game two as Nashville evened the series with a 5–2 win. Nashville goaltender Tomas Vokoun made 38 saves in a losing effort in game three as the Sharks won the game 3–1. Milan Michalek's second goal of the game gave the Sharks an insurmountable lead in game four as San Jose took a 3–2 victory. The teams were tied late into the third period of game five before Sharks captain Patrick Marleau scored the series-winning goal to eliminate the Predators by a final score of 3–2.

Conference Semifinals

Eastern Conference Semifinals

(1) Buffalo Sabres vs. (6) New York Rangers

This was the second and most recent playoff meeting between these two teams with Buffalo winning the only previous series. They last met in the 1978 Preliminary Round where Buffalo won in three games. Buffalo won all four games during this year's regular season series.

Buffalo eliminated the Rangers in six games. Sabres forward Thomas Vanek scored twice including the game-winner as Buffalo took game one 5–2. Chris Drury and Thomas Vanek each scored their fifth goal of the playoffs for the Sabres in the third period of game two as Buffalo overcame a goal deficit, winning by a score of 3–2. In game three Michal Rozsival gave the Rangers a 2–1 win in double overtime by scoring at 16:43. The Rangers scored twice on the power-play in game four as they evened the series with a 2–1 victory. Sabres co-captain Chris Drury scored the tying goal with less than eight seconds remaining and Maxim Afinogenov ended the game 4:39 into the first overtime on the power-play as Buffalo won game five 2–1. Jochen Hecht's second goal of the playoffs was the series-clinching goal as the Sabres ended New York's season with 5–4 victory in game six. As of 2022, this is the Buffalo Sabres last playoff series win.

(2) New Jersey Devils vs. (4) Ottawa Senators

This was the third and most recent playoff meeting between these two teams with the teams splitting the two previous series. They last met in the 2003 Eastern Conference Final where New Jersey won in seven games. New Jersey won three of the four games during this year's regular season series.

Ottawa defeated the Devils in five games. The Senators scored four times in the opening period of game one and hung on to win the game 5–4. The Senators tied game two late in the third period, but Jamie Langenbrunner scored the winning goal for the Devils 1:55 into the second overtime. Game three remained scoreless into the third period before Tom Preissing put the Senators on the board, Ray Emery made 25 saves for his second playoff shutout in a 2–0 Ottawa win. New Jersey goaltender Martin Brodeur made 33 saves in a losing effort in game four as the Senators won 3–2. Ottawa captain Daniel Alfredsson scored the series-winning goal late in the second period of game five as the Senators ended New Jersey's season with a 3–2 win. Game five was also the final game played at Continental Airlines Arena as the Devils began playing at the Prudential Center the following year.

Western Conference Semifinals

(1) Detroit Red Wings vs. (5) San Jose Sharks

This was the third playoff meeting between these two teams with the teams splitting the two previous series. They last met in the 1995 Western Conference Semifinals where Detroit won in four games. San Jose won three of the four games during this year's regular season series.

The Red Wings won three consecutive games to eliminate San Jose in six games. Sharks goaltender Evgeni Nabokov made 34 saves as San Jose shutout the Red Wings in game one by a score of 2–0. Pavel Datsyuk gave the Red Wings the lead with just 1:24 remaining in the third period, taking a 3–2 victory. San Jose forward Jonathan Cheechoo scored the game-winner on the power play in game three as the Sharks won the game 2–1. Detroit came back from a two-goal deficit in game four by scoring in the final minute of both the second and third periods and Mathieu Schneider scored the overtime winner on the power-play for the Red Wings in a 3–2 win. After allowing the opening goal in game five the Red Wings scored four unanswered goals winning the game 4–1. Two goals from Detroit winger Mikael Samuelsson and a shutout by Dominik Hasek in game six ended the series in a 2–0 Red Wings victory.

(2) Anaheim Ducks vs. (3) Vancouver Canucks

This was the first and to date only playoff meeting between these two teams. Anaheim won three of the four games during this year's regular season series.

The Ducks eliminated Vancouver in five games. After allowing the opening goal in game one Anaheim responded with five unanswered goals and won by a final score of 5–1, Ducks forward Andy McDonald recorded a hat trick in the contest. The teams traded a goal apiece during regulation time and Jeff Cowan ended the game 7:49 into double overtime as Vancouver tied the series with a 2–1 victory. Anaheim's special teams made the difference in game three as the Ducks successfully killed off seven penalties and scored twice on the power-play as Anaheim won the game 3–2. The Ducks came back from a two-goal deficit in the third period of game four to force overtime and won the game 3–2 on a goal scored by Travis Moen at 2:07 of the first overtime period. After Vancouver forced overtime in game five goaltender Roberto Luongo was unavailable to his team at the start of the first overtime period as he was suffering from an illness, backup Dany Sabourin stopped five Anaheim shots before Luongo returned to action 3:34 into the period. Shortly into the second overtime period Scott Niedermayer fired a wrist shot that found the back of the net giving the Ducks a 2–1 win that clinched the series and moved them on to the Western Conference Final.

Conference Finals

Eastern Conference Final

(1) Buffalo Sabres vs. (4) Ottawa Senators

This was the fourth and most recent playoff meeting between these two teams, with Buffalo winning all three previous series. They last met in the previous year's Eastern Conference Semifinals where Buffalo won in five games. This was Buffalo's second consecutive Conference Finals appearance, and their fourth overall; they lost to Carolina in seven games in the previous year. Ottawa most recently made it to the Conference Finals in 2003 where they lost to New Jersey in seven games. Ottawa won five of the eight games during this year's regular season series.
	
The Senators advanced to their first Stanley Cup Finals by eliminating the Sabres in five games. The Senators took control of game one in the third period and scored three goals to win 5–2. Buffalo forward Daniel Briere scored with only six seconds left in game two to force overtime. Joe Corvo scored the game-winning goal for Ottawa at 4:58 of double overtime in a 4–3 victory. Ray Emery made 15 saves and Daniel Alfredsson scored the only goal in game three as Ottawa shut out the Sabres 1–0. The Sabres took a three-goal lead just before the halfway point of game four and hung on to force a fifth game with a 3–2 win. Overtime was needed in game five as the teams traded goals through regulation time, Ottawa captain Daniel Alfredsson ended the series with his goal at 9:32 of the first overtime as the Senators won by a final score of 3–2.

Western Conference Final

(1) Detroit Red Wings vs. (2) Anaheim Ducks

This was the fourth playoff meeting between these two teams, with Detroit winning two of the three previous series. They last met in the 2003 Western Conference Quarterfinals where Anaheim won in four games. Detroit most recently made it to the Conference Finals in 2002 where they defeated Colorado in seven games, while Anaheim most recently made it to the Conference Finals in the previous year where they lost in five games to Edmonton. The teams split this year's four-game regular season series.
	
Anaheim defeated the Red Wings in six games. Detroit goaltender Dominik Hasek made 31 saves as the Red Wings took game one with a 2–1 victory. Scott Niedermayer ended game two at 14:17 of the first overtime as the Ducks tied the series with a 4–3 win. The Red Wings chased Ducks goaltender Jean-Sebastien Giguere from game three after he allowed three goals on thirteen shots, Detroit scored two more times and won the game 5–0. After the game Chris Pronger was suspended for one game by the NHL; his suspension was the result of a simultaneous hit on Tomas Holmstrom that Scott Niedermayer was penalized for. While Pronger received no penalty on the play for the hit during the game he was later suspended after NHL officials reviewed the replays, which showed Holmstrom being boarded from behind as a result of a Pronger elbow. The Ducks broke a tie in the third period of game four when Ryan Getzlaf scored on the power-play, they went on to add an empty net goal from Rob Niedermayer that gave Anaheim a 5–3 win that tied the series at two games. Scott Niedermayer forced overtime in game five as he scored on the power-play with 47.3 seconds remaining in the game; Teemu Selanne completed the comeback for Anaheim at 11:57 of the first overtime period as the Ducks took a 2–1 victory. The Red Wings mounted a late comeback attempt in game six before coming up short in a 4–3 loss than ended the series and sent Anaheim to the second Stanley Cup Finals in their history.

Stanley Cup Finals

This was the first and to date only playoff meeting between these two teams. Anaheim most recently made it to the Finals in 2003 where they were defeated by New Jersey in seven games, while Ottawa made their first Finals appearance in their fifteenth season. This was the first Finals series to be played in Ottawa since the original Ottawa Senators won the Stanley Cup in 1927. For the first time since 1999, neither of the two Stanley Cup finalists had previously won the Stanley Cup. The teams did not play each other during this year's regular season. Anaheim became the first team based in the Pacific Time zone in the NHL's modern era to win the Stanley Cup; they also became the first west coast team to win the Stanley Cup since the Victoria Cougars in 1925.

Player statistics

Skaters
GP = Games played; G = Goals; A = Assists; Pts = Points; +/– = Plus/minus; PIM = Penalty minutes

Goaltending
These are the top five goaltenders based on either goals against average or save percentage with at least four games played.

GP = Games played; W = Wins; L = Losses; SA = Shots against; GA = Goals against; GAA = Goals against average; TOI = Time On Ice (minutes:seconds); Sv% = Save percentage; SO = Shutouts

Events and milestones
Detroit Red Wings defenceman Chris Chelios made his 22nd post-season appearance, breaking the record for most post-season appearances. The New York Rangers set a new post-season franchise record that year by defeating the Atlanta Thrashers 7–0 on April 17.

See also
2006–07 NHL season
List of NHL seasons
2007 in ice hockey

References

playoffs
Stanley Cup playoffs